RTR ("Radio Televisión Riojana", call sign LV 91 TV) is an Argentine television station operated by the government of La Rioja Province and broadcasting on channel 9. It serves the provinces of La Rioja and Catamarca (through a repeater on channel 13), and a small part of San Luis. The station broadcasts from La Rioja, capital of the province.

RTR produces two newscasts: one with local news and other with news from Catamarca. A weekend cultural show called La Rioja que Usted no Conoce ("The La Rioja You Don't Know") is also presented.

Most of the schedule is filled with the network offerings: soap operas, national news, movies, sitcoms and cartoons.

Local programming
Noticiero 9 ("News 9") - newscast
Catamarca es noticia ("Catamarca is on the news") - newscast
Queda mucho por descubrir ("There's a lot to discover") - travelogue
Misa Dominical ("Sunday Mass") - religion

Television stations in Argentina
Television channels and stations established in 1964